The Second Reformation was an evangelical campaign from the 1820s onwards, organised by theological conservatives in the Church of Ireland and Church of England.

History
Evangelical clergymen were known as "Biblicals" or "New Reformers". The Second Reformation was most zealously prosecuted in Connacht where it was encouraged by Thomas Plunket, 2nd Baron Plunket, the Anglican Bishop of Tuam, Killala and Achonry. Opposition in the west was led by the Roman Catholic Archbishop of Tuam, John MacHale. The movement endeavoured (unsuccessfully) and in ecumenical terms disastrously, to proselytise amongst the Roman Catholic population of Ireland, frequently by highly dubious means in which material benefits were offered as a reward for conversion. The occasion of the Great Famine (Ireland) was also seized upon by the "new Reformers". To get food, starving Catholics were obliged to apply to the work house of the local Poor Law union. Conversion was expected upon admittance. Quaker and Irish politician Alfred Webb later wrote:

Conversions exacted under the duress of those circumstances were often not long lived as the convert may not have been acting out of personal conviction. 

The Second Reformation was also opposed by moderates in the Church of Ireland. It petered out during the 1860s.

Other meanings
The term 'Second Reformation' has been used in a number of contexts in Protestantism, and continues to be used by some to refer to contemporary events.  In Germany and Northern Europe generally it is likely to refer to a period of Calvinist pressure on Lutheranism from about 1560–1619. The "Dutch Second Reformation" or Nadere Reformatie ("Another Reformation") is usually placed rather later, from about 1600 onwards, and had much in common with English Puritanism.

Notes

References
 Michalski, Sergiusz. Reformation and the Visual Arts: The Protestant Image Question in Western and Eastern Europe, Routledge, 1993, 9780203414255 Google Books
 Irene Whelan (2005), The Bible War in Ireland: The Second Reformation and the Polarization of Protestant-Catholic Relations, 1800–1840
 Desmond Bowen (1978), "The Protestant Crusade in Ireland, 1800-70"

19th-century Protestantism
History of the Church of England
19th century in Ireland
Church of Ireland